Brandeau is a surname. Notable people with the surname include:

Esther Brandeau (born  1718), first Jew in Canada
Margaret Brandeau, American management scientist and engineer

See also
Brando (disambiguation)
Suikoden IV, video game featuring an antagonist named Brandeau